Juan Fernández de Velasco, 5th Duke of Frías ( – 15 March 1613) was a Spanish nobleman and diplomat.

Biography
Juan Fernández de Velasco was the son of Íñigo Fernández de Velasco; and of Maria Angela de Aragón y Guzmán El Bueno. He inherited his father's title of Constable of Castile, and was present at the signing of the Treaty of London (1604). 

The Spanish ambassador, the Count of Villamediana, asked King James if Velasco could be lodged at Somerset House, and Anne of Denmark granted his request. The lodging was decorated with royal tapestries and Velasco arrived on 20 August 1604.

He came to Somerset House on a barge on the Thames. His arrival was watched by spectators in boats, including Anne of Denmark, the Earl of Nottingham, and Robert Cecil. The queen wore a mask and their barge was disguised, without royal insignia. 

He saw King James on 25 August and had an audience with Anne of Denmark three days later, and he watched Prince Henry dance and exercise with a pike in the garden. He gave the prince a pony. 

Juan Fernández de Velasco was Governor of the Duchy of Milan in the period 1592–1600 and 1610–1612. In 1595, he led the Spanish forces in the Battle of Fontaine-Française against the French, where he let victory slip through his fingers, due to excessive caution.

Works

Descendants
Around 1580, the Duke married María Girón de Guzmán, eldest daughter of Pedro Girón de la Cueva, 1st Duke of Osuna. Together they had a son and a daughter. The daughter, Ana de Velasco y Girón in turn married Teodósio II, Duke of Braganza and in 1604 gave birth to João, 8th Duke of Bragança, who was crowned King João IV of Portugal on 1 December 1640. In 1608, after the death of his first wife, Juan Fernández de Velasco married Joana de Córdoba y Aragón, and together they had three children:

By María Girón de Guzmán:
Íñigo Fernández de Velasco, 9th Count of Haro
Ana de Velasco y Girón, married Teodósio II, Duke of Braganza being the mother of King John IV of Portugal

By Joana de Córdoba y Aragón:
Bernardino Fernández de Velasco, 6th Duke of Frías, married Isabel Maria de Guzmán
Luis de Velasco, 1st Marquis del Fresno, married Catarina de Velasco
Mariana Fernandez de Velasco, deceased 1650, married António II Alvarez de Toledo, 7th Duke of Alba, 4th Duke of Huéscar, a Knight of the Order of the Golden Fleece since 1675,  (1615–1690).

Notes

Sources

1550s births
1613 deaths
Governors of the Duchy of Milan
Marquesses of Berlanga
107
Counts of Castilnovo
Juan
Juan
Spanish diplomats
16th-century Spanish nobility
17th-century Spanish nobility